Potato River may refer to:

Potato River (Michigan), a tributary of Lake Superior
Potato River (Minnesota), a tributary of the Fish Hook River
Potato River (Wisconsin), a tributary of the Bad River

See also
Potato Creek (disambiguation)